David Lister may refer to:
 Dave Lister, a fictional character from the British science fiction situation comedy Red Dwarf
 David Lister (director), South African-born film and television director
 David Lister (origami historian) (1930–2013), British origami historian

See also
 David Cunliffe-Lister, 2nd Earl of Swinton (1937–2006), British peer and politician